Notre Dame High School (NDWH) is a private, Roman Catholic, all-male college preparatory school located in West Haven, Connecticut, a coastal suburb of New Haven, Connecticut.

History 

Notre Dame High School was founded in 1946 by the Congregation of Holy Cross, the same religious institute that established the University of Notre Dame. The school's name derives from the French Notre Dame, meaning "Our Lady".  Situated on a hill, the school originally comprised several buildings, one of which is Harugari Hall (now in the possession of the neighboring University of New Haven).

Announced in 2007, the new 28,000-square-foot Arts, Technology, and Spiritual Center was officially opened for the 2012–13 academic school year. On September 16, 2012, Reverend Henry J. Mansell, Archbishop of Hartford presided over the blessing and dedication of this addition, which houses the Saint Brother André Bessette Chapel, the Maureen and George Collins ’58 Auditorium, an enhanced Music Room (which includes practice rooms and a technology room),a new Library and Media Center, and a Technology Classroom.

In 2014, Notre Dame High School began raising funds for the "Field of Dreams" project, which aimed to create new football practice fields and renovate the outdoor track.

Administration and academics 

Located in the Roman Catholic Archdiocese of Hartford, Notre Dame is operated independently by the Congregation of Holy Cross.  The school is run day-to-day on a Headmaster-Principal model.  Notre Dame draws a diverse student body from across the New Haven County area and beyond.  Its sister school is Sacred Heart Academy, located in Hamden, Connecticut. The teaching faculty is composed predominantly of laypeople, though there are still a handful of Brothers.  Both "extended study" and "semester at college" programs are available to qualified students during their senior year.

Athletics 

Known as the "Green Knights," Notre Dame High School's athletes boast a rich tradition of success with notable football, ice hockey, baseball, golf, basketball, swim and track programs.  The school also competes in wrestling, lacrosse, and most recently, crew. Notre Dame is a member of the Southern Connecticut Conference.  Its gymnasium is decorated with several league and state championship banners and the names of All-State athletes.

Notable alumni

 Tom Condon, Class of 1970 – former NFL football player
 Daniel Cosgrove, Class of 1989 – actor
 Matt DelGuidice, Class of 1985 – former NHL hockey player
 John DeStefano, Jr., Class of 1973 – former Mayor of New Haven, Connecticut
 Bob DuPuy, Class of 1964 – former President and Chief Operating Officer of Major League Baseball
 Alan Catello Grazioso, Class of 1987 - Emmy Award-winning television producer, director, and editor 
 James J. Griffin, Class of 1967, author of traditional western and Texas Ranger novels
 George S. Logan, Class of 1987 - Connecticut State Senator
 John Moffitt, Class of 2006 – NFL football player 
 Leigh Montville, Class of 1961 – journalist and columnist 
 Wayne Pacelle, Class of 1983 – former president and CEO of The Humane Society of the United States
 John M. Picard, Class of 1983 – former Mayor of West Haven, Connecticut (2005–2013)
 Nick Pietrosante, Class of 1954 – former All-American for University of Notre Dame and NFL football player 
 Tarek Saleh, Class of 1993 – former NFL football player
 Tremont Waters, Class of 2017 – former LSU point guard, drafted in the 2nd round of the NBA Draft by the Boston Celtics

See also 
 Congregation of Holy Cross
 List of high school football rivalries (less than 100 years old)

References

External links 
 
 Roman Catholic Archdiocese of Hartford

Boys' schools in the United States
Educational institutions established in 1946
Holy Cross secondary schools
Catholic secondary schools in Connecticut
Schools in New Haven County, Connecticut
Buildings and structures in West Haven, Connecticut
1946 establishments in Connecticut